Kumlu is a district of Hatay Province, in the Amik Valley plain, on the road between Antakya and Reyhanli in Turkey.

History
Kumlu is known for the mineral baths of "Hamamat". Kumlu was founded in 1968 by Aziz Tavım.

Geography 
The Area of Kumlu is 193 km2. To the west and north of Kumlu is Kirikhan; to the east is Syria; and to the south is Reyhanli.  The general landscape of Kumlu is very flat.  The Amik Plain includes tiny plateaus. Kumlu is situated at a height of 97 meters (318 feet).  At the centre of Kumlu is a flat area in the Amik Plain.

Population

References

Populated places in Hatay Province
Districts of Hatay Province